More Than Words: The Best of Kevin Kern, or simply More Than Words, is the first compilation album from American new-age pianist Kevin Kern. As with his preceding and succeeding albums, it is an album of instrumental songs. The compilation contains two new compositions, plus songs from all five of Kern's previous studio albums. It was released on September 3, 2002.

"Out of the Darkness into the Light" is not actually a new composition for the album per se; the liner notes indicate that it was composed for a Real Music compilation album called Freedom to Love, and that it was only re-arranged for More Than Words. "Children at Play", however, was specifically made for this album.

The track listing printed is incorrect; track 14 is actually "A Gentle Whisper", taken from the same album as "Blossom on the Wind" was from. However, Kevin Kern's official website still lists the song as "Blossom on the Wind" and plays a snippet of that song when selected; on the other hand, Allmusic correctly depicts the snippet and duration, but still incorrectly labels the song title. In addition to this, the liner notes incorrectly print the durations of "Out of the Darkness Into the Light" and "Children at Play".

Track listing

Liner Notes
From five highly successful and internationally acclaimed albums comes a wondrous collection of favorite Kevin Kern classics.

Fourteen songs, including exquisite new compositions especially for this collection, to heal, uplift or simply bring a smile of tranquility to the listener. As reviewers have said,

Personnel
 Kevin Kern - Piano, Keyboards, Producer
 Jeff Linsky - Guitar
 Terence Yallop - Executive Producer

References

External links
Kevin Kern's official website
Kevin Kern at Real Music

2002 greatest hits albums
Kevin Kern albums